is a Japanese actor, best known for his role as Go Shijima/Kamen Rider Mach in the Kamen Rider series Kamen Rider Drive.

Biography
Inaba was born in Sagamihara, Kanagawa Prefecture. In November 2009, when he was a 16-year-old high school sophomore, he won the 22nd Junon Super Boy Contest Grand Prix. Inaba was awarded from among the largest number of 15,491 people. In 2010, he debuted in the TV drama Clone Baby. In 2011, Inaba first starred in the stage play Sanada Ten Braves: Boku-ra ga mamoritakatta mono.

Filmography

TV series

Films

References

External links
 Official profile at LesPros Entertainment
 
 

1993 births
Living people
People from Sagamihara
People from Kanagawa Prefecture
Kamen Rider
21st-century Japanese male actors